Natalia Andreevna Kapitonova (born 31 May 2000) is a Russian artistic gymnast.

Junior career

2013-2014

In 2013, Kapitonova won team silver at the Russian Junior Championships and silver on bars at the Voronin Cup. The following year, she competed at the Russian Hopes, winning gold on floor exercise and silver in the all-around and on bars. She made her international debut in France at the Tournoi International Combs-la-Ville, winning team, all-around, and uneven bars gold and floor exercise bronze. At the Voronin Cup at the end of the year, she won team silver and uneven bars gold.

2015

In March, Kapitonova competed at the International Gymnix, winning uneven bars gold, team and all-around silver, vault bronze, and placing fourth on floor and fifth on beam. At the Russian Junior Championships in April, she won uneven bars silver, team bronze, and placed fourth on beam and floor and fifth in the all-around. At the Student Spartakiada in June, she won all-around, balance beam, and floor exercise gold, team and vault silver, and uneven bars bronze.

In November she competed at the Elite Gym Massilia in Marseille, France, where she took the uneven bars gold medal and helped her team to silver, finishing fourth individually all-around. At the Voronin Cup in December, she beat teammate Angelina Melnikova to the all-around junior title.

Senior career

2016
On March 18-20, Kapitonova debuted in international competition at the DTB Pokal Team Challenge Cup where Team Russia won the gold medal.
On April 30-May 1, she competed at the Osijek World Cup where he won silver in floor and bronze in uneven bars.

2017
On March 2 during the Russian Nationals held in Kazan, Russia ,  Kapitonova defeated Olympians  Seda Tuthkhalyan, Angelina Melnikova as well as 2016 Junior European Champion Elena Eremina to become the Russian National All-Around Champion as well as the co-Uneven Bars Champion with Daria Spiridonova. She was then assigned to DTB Pokal Team Challenge Cup at Stuttgart, Germany. She helped the Russian team win gold by nearly 5 points. Then, she attended the 2017 Jesolo Trophy event where she contributed to the bronze medal performance of the Russian squad. After her clutch performances at these competitions, Kapitonova was named to the Russian Team for the 2017 Europeans.

Competitive history

Junior

Senior

References

External links
 
 Natalia Kapitonova Profile 
 Gymnastics Results
 

2000 births
Living people
Russian female artistic gymnasts
21st-century Russian women